The Indian cricket team toured Zimbabwe from 11 June to 22 June 2016 playing three One Day Internationals (ODIs) and three Twenty20 Internationals (T20Is). Two weeks prior to the series, Zimbabwe Cricket sacked Hamilton Masakadza as captain and replaced him with Graeme Cremer.

Makhaya Ntini, interim coach of the Zimbabwe side, was critical of India's inexperienced squad selected for the series saying "if you send us a team that is not your strongest team, we're going to put them under the carpet". India went on to win the ODI series 3–0, losing the fewest wickets for a team during a three-match series. India also won the T20I series, two matches to one.

Squads

ODI series

1st ODI

2nd ODI

3rd ODI

T20I series

1st T20I

2nd T20I

3rd T20I

References

External links
 Series home at ESPN Cricinfo

2016 in Indian cricket
2016 in Zimbabwean cricket
International cricket competitions in 2016
Indian cricket tours of Zimbabwe